The Nelson-class cruisers were a pair of armoured cruisers built in the 1870s for the Royal Navy.

Design and description

The ships were not much liked in service as they were deemed too weakly armoured to fight ironclad battleships and not fast enough to catch commerce-raiding cruisers. They were laid out as central battery ironclads with the armament concentrated amidships.

The ships displaced , about  more than Shannon. The steel-hulled ships were fitted with a ram and their crew numbered approximately 560 officers and other ranks.

The ships had two 3-cylinder, inverted compound steam engines, each driving a single two-bladed,  propeller, using steam provided by 10 oval boilers. The cylinders of the latter's engines could be adjusted in volume to optimize steam production depending on the demand. They were troublesome throughout the ship's life and she was always about  slower than her sister despite repeated efforts to improve her speed.

Ships
The following table gives the construction details and purchase cost of the Nelson class. Standard British practice at that time was for these costs to exclude armament and stores. In the table:
Machinery meant "propelling machinery".
Hull included "hydraulic machinery, gun mountings, etc."

Service
Nelson was assigned to the Australia Station in 1881 and became the flagship there in 1885. She remained on station until returning home in 1889 for a lengthy refit. The ship then became guardship at Portsmouth in October 1891 and was placed in fleet reserve in 1894. Nelson was degraded to dockyard reserve in April 1901 and hulked seven months later as a training ship for stokers. She was sold for scrap in July 1910.

Northampton became flagship of the North America and West Indies Station upon commissioning in 1879 and remained there for the next seven years. Upon her return, she was assigned to the reserve and made annual training cruises until she became a boys' training ship in 1894. The ship was paid off ten years later and sold for scrap in April 1905.

Notes

References
 Brassey, T.A. (ed) The Naval Annual 1895

External links

Cruiser classes
 
Ship classes of the Royal Navy